Microdon mutabilis, is a species of hoverfly. It is found in many parts of Britain and Europe. The distinctive almost slug-like larvae live in ants' nests. They are hemispherical in shape, heavily armoured and believed to prey on the eggs and larvae of a number of ant species, including Formica lemani, Formica fusca, Lasius niger and Myrmica ruginodis. It was described by Carl Linnaeus in his landmark 1758 10th edition of Systema Naturae.

Description

Wing length 6–9 mm. Pterostigma 2-2.5 times as long as the length of the wing margin between ends of wing veins R1 and R2+3. Scutellum red or dark red. The male genitalia are figured by Doczkal and Schmid (1999). Note M. mutabilis is only reliably distinguished from M. myrmicae by features of the puparium.
See references for determination.

References

External links
 With images.

Microdontinae
Diptera of Europe
Flies described in 1758
Taxa named by Carl Linnaeus